Eddie Nash (April 3, 1929 – August 9, 2014) was an American nightclub owner and restaurateur in Los Angeles, as well as a convicted money launderer and drug dealer. Nash was allegedly the mastermind behind the Wonderland Murders, but was never convicted, despite multiple arrests and trials.

Early life
Nash was born Adel Gharib Nasrallah in  Mandatory Palestine. His family were Orthodox Christian Palestinians from the city of Ramallah, just outside Jerusalem. Before the creation of Israel in 1948, Nash's family owned 48 hotels. In the early 1950s, Nash immigrated to the United States with only $7.
He briefly found work as an actor and stuntman, and was an expert horseman. In 1952, he appeared in a small role as a character named "Nash" in an episode of the Western series The Cisco Kid.

In the 1960s, Nash opened a hot dog stand called Beef's Chuck on Hollywood Boulevard. By the 1970s, Nash owned several nightclubs and restaurants in Los Angeles, such as the P.J.'s club (shortly afterward renamed Starwood) in West Hollywood, the Soul'd Out club in  Hollywood, the Odyssey disco, the Paradise Ballroom, the Seven Seas, Ali Baba's, and The Kit Kat strip club. Nash's clubs attracted diverse groups, as he operated clubs marketed towards gays, heterosexuals, teenagers, African Americans, and other target audiences.

Wonderland murders

Nash was allegedly involved in the quadruple Wonderland Murders in 1981; the suspected motive was as a retaliation for the robbery of Nash's home perpetrated two days earlier by three to five men. A key player in the incident, adult film performer John C. Holmes,  was later acquitted of the murders.
Nash and Holmes were well acquainted with each other; Nash enjoyed introducing his countless houseguests to Holmes, who was infamous for playing the X-rated movie character "Johnny Wadd."

However, by 1981, Holmes had become desperately addicted to freebasing cocaine, and as a result, his career had declined due to chronic impotence. In order to settle a substantial debt to drug kingpin Ron Launius, leader of the widely feared Wonderland Gang which dominated the Los Angeles cocaine trade, Holmes helped the group plan the invasion. Holmes went to Nash's home on the morning of the attack to leave a sliding door unlocked so the Gang could enter the home. On June 29, 1981, the Wonderland Gang entered into Nash's home via the unlocked sliding door, held Nash and his bodyguard at gunpoint, and stole Nash's drugs, jewelry and money. At one point, one of the Wonderland Gang's member's guns went off, grazing Nash's bodyguard's face. Nash was then made to beg for life on his knees, an act that he found humiliating. Nash quickly suspected John Holmes was involved in the robbery as he had been at Nash's home the morning of the robbery. The following day, a friend of Nash's confirmed his suspicions after telling him he had seen Holmes wearing some of his stolen jewelry.

On July 1, two days after Nash was robbed, Ron Launius, Billy Deverell, Joy Audrey Gold Miller, and Barbara Richardson were found bludgeoned to death at their home at 8763 Wonderland Avenue in Laurel Canyon, Los Angeles. Susan Launius, Ron's wife, was critically injured but survived. 
Officials from the Los Angeles Police Department (LAPD) remarked that the Wonderland Murders were particularly brutal, noting that the crime scene was bloodier than the Tate-LaBianca murders.

Nash was believed to have planned the murders that were committed by three of his henchmen. Nash planned to kill John Holmes but later decided to spare Holmes' life and use the Wonderland murders to "teach Holmes a lesson". Holmes later told his first wife, Sharon, he was forced to accompany three gunmen to the Wonderland Avenue home. He claimed he was then held at gunpoint and forced to watch the quadruple murders. While police believe Holmes likely took part in the murders, Holmes would maintain that he never killed anyone.

A police search of Nash's home days after the murders revealed a large amount of cocaine. Nash was sentenced to eight years in prison, but a judge released him after just two, purportedly due to Nash's poor health. An associate of Nash later admitted that they had bribed the judge with about $100,000.

In 1990, Nash was tried in state court for having planned the murders; the trial resulted in an 11–1 hung jury. Nash would later admit that he had bribed the lone holdout, a young woman, with $50,000. The retrial ended in an acquittal.

According to John Holmes' second wife Laurie (known as Misty Dawn), in a Playboy magazine interview, "He [Eddie Nash] was an awful man... John told me he used to leave the bathrooms without toilet paper, then offer the young women cocaine if they'd lick his ass clean."

Throughout the 1990s, law enforcement figures continued to hound Nash, who had been referred to in various print media as "the one who got away". In 1995, in a broad series of raids targeting alleged organized crime figures, federal agents armed with search warrants raided Nash's house and confiscated what was thought to be a cache of methamphetamine. To the chagrin of law enforcement, the "meth" turned out to be a cache of mothballs, and no charges were filed against Nash.

In 2000, after a four-year joint investigation involving local and federal authorities, Nash was arrested and indicted on federal charges under the Racketeer Influenced and Corrupt Organizations Act (RICO) for running a drug trafficking and money laundering operation, conspiring to carry out the Wonderland Murders, and bribing one of the jurors of his first trial. Nash, by this point in his seventies, and suffering from emphysema and several other ailments, agreed to a plea bargain agreement in September 2001, pleading guilty to RICO charges and to money laundering. He also admitted to jury tampering (for which the statute of limitations had run out) and to having ordered his associates to retrieve stolen property from the Wonderland house, which might have resulted in violence including murder, but he denied having planned the murders that occurred. He also agreed to cooperate with law enforcement authorities. In exchange, he received a four-and-a-half year prison sentence (including time already served) and a $250,000 fine.

Bautista murders
On September 6 or 7, 1984, Nash's former lover Maureen Bautista and her son Telesforo were stabbed to death by Hells Angels biker Robert Frederick Garceau.
Garceau was turned in to the police after he murdered Greg Rambo, who had helped him dispose of the Bautistas' bodies. Rambo's wife, Susan, knew of the Bautista murders and talked to the police under an agreement of immunity.

During the trial, Susan Rambo testified that Harlyn Codd had told her Nash was Telesforo's father, and that Nash once had paid Garceau to fulfill a contract but that Garceau had failed to perform and, as a result, Nash was "looking for" Garceau.  At trial, evidence was presented that Garceau murdered Bautista because she threatened to expose Garceau's drug operations to Nash, and Garceau killed her son because Telesforo had witnessed Bautista's murder. Garceau was convicted of all three murders and sentenced to death.

A lengthy court appeal of Garceau's death sentence was begun, but in 1993 the California Supreme Court upheld the legality of what became known as "The Nash testimony." Garceau died from cancer on San Quentin's death row on December 29, 2004.

Death
On August 9, 2014, Nash died at the age of 85. He is interred at Holy Cross Cemetery, Culver City in Culver City.

In popular culture

Films
In the movie Boogie Nights (1997), Alfred Molina plays a character named Rahad Jackson, whose bodyguard, home, and living situation are heavily influenced by Nash's.
In the movie Wonderland (2003), Nash is portrayed by actor Eric Bogosian.

Further reading

References

External links
 
 
 
 

1929 births
2014 deaths
20th-century American businesspeople
20th-century American criminals
American businesspeople convicted of crimes
American drug traffickers
American male television actors
American gangsters
American money launderers
Place of death missing
American restaurateurs
Burials at Holy Cross Cemetery, Culver City
Businesspeople from Los Angeles
Gangsters from Los Angeles
Palestinian emigrants to the United States
People acquitted of murder
People from Ramallah
Prisoners and detainees of California
Nightclub owners